Antoinette "Tony" Flegenheim (11 May 1863 – 8 April 1943) was a survivor of the sinking of the RMS Titanic.

Early life
Flegenheim was born Berta Antonia Maria Wendt on 11 May 1863 in Himmelpfort near Berlin, Germany.  Her parents were Wilhelm and Pauline Wendt.

In 1890, she moved to New York and married a fellow German, Alfred Flegenheim.  Alfred died on 23 November 1907.  Flegenheim was wealthy and possessed residences both in Berlin and Manhattan.

Sinking of Titanic

Flegenheim was one of the 281 passengers who boarded  on 10 April 1912 when it took its first stop in Cherbourg, France.  She travelled in first class.  The vessel would take one more stop in Queenstown, Ireland before the ill-fated transatlantic crossing.  On 14 April 1912, Titanic collided with an iceberg on its maiden voyage in the North Atlantic Ocean.

At 00:45 on 15 April 1912, Flegenheim departed Titanic with 27 others on Lifeboat No. 7, the first to be lowered.  The lifeboat was deployed without its plug and began to take on water which, as fellow lifeboat occupant Dorothy Gibson put it, was "remedied" by lingerie and garments being stuffed into the hole.

Later life
Soon after the sinking of Titanic, on 20 June 1912, Flegenheim married Briton Paul Elliot Whitehurst (born c. 1878).

She and Whitehurst lived in The Hague, Netherlands during the First World War but the two separated in this period.

Flegenheim died in Frankfurt, Nazi Germany on 8 April 1943.

References

RMS Titanic survivors
1863 births
1943 deaths
19th-century German women
20th-century German women